Porto Torres Lighthouse is an active lighthouse located on Monte Agellu dominating the harbour of Porto Torres in the Gulf of Asinara on the Sea of Sardinia.

History
It had the role of observation and protection of the town placed, at the time, on Monte Agellu.

Description
The turret and the lantern are painted white, the lantern dome in grey metallic. The lighthouse is completely automated and managed by the Marina Militare with the identification code number 1437 E.F.

See also
 List of lighthouses in Italy

References

External links

 Servizio Fari Marina Militare

Lighthouses in Italy
Buildings and structures in Sardinia